Chol HaMoed, a Hebrew phrase meaning "mundane of the festival", refers to the intermediate days of Passover and Sukkot. As the name implies, these days mix features of "chol" (mundane) and "moed" (festival).

On Passover, Chol HaMoed consists of the second through sixth days of the holiday (third through sixth in the Diaspora). On Sukkot, Chol HaMoed consists of the second through seventh days (third through seventh in the Diaspora).

Although it has a unique name, Hoshanah Rabbah, the seventh day of Sukkot, is part of Chol HaMoed. Prayer services that day combine some usual practices of Chol HaMoed with practices of both Yom Tov and the High Holy Days.

General concepts
Chol HaMoed combines features of weekday (Chol) and festival (Moed).

Weekday (Chol)
Work 

On weekdays during Chol HaMoed the usual restrictions that apply to the Biblical Jewish holidays are relaxed, but not entirely eliminated. For example, work that would normally be prohibited on the festival would be allowed to prevent financial loss or if the results of the work are needed for the festival itself. Work for public need is also allowed.  If one has the ability to take vacation from work without financial loss during those days, he or she is normally required to do so. Many tasks such as laundry washing, hair cutting and shaving are to be avoided except in some circumstances. 
Prayers. Prayers on weekdays during Chol HaMoed are based on the weekday order of prayers, not the festival order of prayers.

Festival (Moed)
The principal customs of the respective festivals continue throughout the festival:
Use of matzo and avoidance of products with leavening (chametz) on Passover
Dwelling in the sukkah (every day) and use of the Four Species (except on the Sabbath) on Sukkot
Another special addition was the Musaf offering offered in the temple in Jerusalem
Four people are called to the torah instead of the weekday three

Ya'aleh v'Yavo is added to the Amidah and Birkat HaMazon on these days. Hallel and Mussaf prayers are said on these days, as on Yom Tov, although on Chol Hamoed of Passover, an abridged form of Hallel is recited. Hoshanot are recited on Sukkot. The tachanun prayer is omitted.

On weekdays during Chol HaMoed there are four aliyot at the Torah reading in synagogue, as opposed to the standard three of weekdays, pointing to the festive nature of Chol HaMoed.

Tefillin

On weekdays during Chol HaMoed, there are variant customs regarding whether tefillin should be worn, reflecting the dual nature of the day. Many streams of Ashkenazi Jews and Yemenite Jews do wear them (as on weekdays) as well as those following the non-Hasidic Lithuanian tradition. Sephardic Jews, Ashkenazi followers of the Vilna Gaon and most Chassidim,  or those with Hasidic ancestry, do not (as on festivals).  However, in some Hasidic communities, such as Sanz, Bobov Sanzklausenbarg, and many in Satmar, men who were never married (known as bachurim) - or in some communities until the age of eighteen when considered of marriageable age - do wear tefillin; in all Hasidic communities (with the exception of some of those who never really excepted Hasidic custom such as Erlau) married (or formerly married) men do not wear tefillin during Chol HaMoed.  In the United States, and most of the Diaspora, both customs are widely seen in practice. In Israel however, the customs of the Vilna Gaon have a stronger influence, so few Jews in Israel wear tefillin on Chol HaMoed, and most of those who do only do so privately before public prayer services unless they go to a minyan that does; nevertheless, in recent years a number of "tefillin minyanim" have started in Israel.

Among those who do wear tefillin on Chol HaMoed, some omit or recite the blessings, depending on one's ancestral custom. Most of those who wear tefillin on Chol HaMoed remove the tefillin before Hallel out of respect for the festive nature of Chol HaMoed which is especially palpable during the recitation of Hallel. The exception to this practice is the third day of Passover, when the Torah reading (which follows Hallel) discusses the mitzvah of tefillin, so many only remove the tefillin after the Torah reading is completed and the Torah scroll has been returned to the Ark.

Shabbos Chol HaMoed

Shabbos Chol HaMoed or Shabbat Chol HaMoed, a Sabbath that occurs during Chol HaMoed, is observed like any other Sabbath in almost every respect. In particular, the usual restrictions on work apply fully, as on any other Sabbath.

Shabbos Chol Hamoed differs from an "ordinary" Sabbath in the following ways:

Prayers:
In most Eastern Ashkenazic communities, Kabbalat Shabbat is abbreviated.  In many Western Ashkenazic and Sephardic communities, it is recited as normal.
Ya'aleh v'Yavo (as throughout Chol HaMoed)
Hallel (as throughout Chol HaMoed)
According to Ashkenazi custom, reading of Song of Songs on Passover or Ecclesiastes on Sukkot
Torah Reading: seven aliyot as usual, but the Weekly Torah portion and Haftarah are replaced by readings particular to the Festival
Mussaf for the Festival (as throughout Chol HaMoed) replaces that for an "ordinary" Sabbath, with additions for the Sabbath
On sukkot: Most communities recite Hoshanot (as throughout Sukkot, but without using the Four Species nor removing Torah scrolls from the Ark); however, the practice of some of the Gaonim, and adopted by the Vilna Gaon and Chabad is not to recite Hoshanot at all on Shabbat.
Meals: Use of matzo instead of regular bread on Passover; meals eaten in the sukkah on Sukkot.

See also
 Isru chag refers to the day after each of the Three Pilgrimage Festivals.
 Mimouna, a traditional North African Jewish celebration held the day after Passover.
 Pesach Sheni, is exactly one month after 14 Nisan.
 Purim Katan is when during a Jewish leap year Purim is celebrated during Adar II so that the 14th of Adar I is then called Purim Katan.
 Shushan Purim falls on Adar 15 and is the day on which Jews in Jerusalem celebrate Purim.
 Yom Kippur Katan is a practice observed by some Jews on the day preceding each Rosh Chodesh or New-Moon Day.
 Yom tov sheni shel galuyot refers to the observance of an extra day of Jewish holidays outside of the land of Israel.

References

External links
 Maimonides discusses Chol HaMoed towards the end of Hilkhot Shevitat Yom Tov, part of his 12th-century Mishneh Torah. A 1993 English translation and commentary are available for free online. See 6:22–24, chapter 7, and chapter 8.
 Rabbi Eliezer Melamed Melakha on Ḥol Ha-mo’ed in Peninei Halakha

Hallel
Hebrew names of Jewish holy days
Hebrew words and phrases in Jewish law
Nisan observances
Passover
Sukkot
Tishrei observances